Nikola Malešević (born 25 August 1989) is a Serbian professional basketball player for KK Rabotnički of the Macedonian First League.

Personal life 
He is the brother of Serbian volleyball player Tijana Malešević.

External links 
 Profile at aba-liga.com
 Profile at eurobasket.com

1989 births
Living people
ABA League players
AZS Koszalin players
Basketball League of Serbia players
Competitors at the 2013 Mediterranean Games
KK Cibona players
KK Metalac Valjevo players
KK Sloboda Užice players
KK Zlatibor players
Medalists at the 2013 Summer Universiade
Mediterranean Games medalists in basketball
Mediterranean Games silver medalists for Serbia
Rhode Island Rams men's basketball players
OKK Beograd players
Serbian expatriate basketball people in Bosnia and Herzegovina
Serbian expatriate basketball people in Croatia
Serbian expatriate basketball people in North Macedonia
Serbian expatriate basketball people in Poland
Serbian expatriate basketball people in Romania
Serbian expatriate basketball people in the United States
Serbian men's basketball players
Śląsk Wrocław basketball players
Small forwards
Sportspeople from Užice
Universiade bronze medalists for Serbia
Universiade medalists in basketball